In taxonomy, Thermocladium is a genus of the Thermoproteaceae.

References

Further reading

Scientific journals

Scientific books

Scientific databases

External links

Archaea genera
Thermoproteota